David "Dave" Downs is a former professional rugby league footballer who played in the 1970s and 1980s. He played at club level for the Featherstone Rovers (Heritage № 556).

Club career
David Downs made his debut for Featherstone Rovers on Sunday 10 December 1978.

References

English rugby league players
Featherstone Rovers players
Place of birth missing
Year of birth missing